The Majlis al-Shura (consultative council or Shura council) is the overarching political and decision making body of Hamas. It includes representatives from the Gaza Strip, the West Bank, Israeli prisons, and the exiled external leadership, the Political Bureau, based in Turkey and Qatar (originally based in Damascus prior to Syrian War). Under this Shura council are committees responsible for supervising Hamas activities, from media relations to military operations. In the West Bank and Gaza, local Shura committees answer to the Shura council and carry out its decisions.

The highest decision-making body of the Majlis al-Shura is its Political Bureau, which consists of 15 members and operates in exile. The bureau is elected by members who select their representatives in local Consultative Councils in specific geographic regions. The councils then nominate representatives to the General Consultative Council, and the Political Bureau is elected by members of the General Consultative Council.

References

Hamas
Politics of the Gaza Strip
Organizations with year of establishment missing